The Bahamas Olympic Committee formerly the Bahamas Olympic Association (IOC code: BAH) is the National Olympic Committee representing the Bahamas. The committee is also the Commonwealth Games Association representing the island nation.

History
By 1969, the Bahamas Olympic Committee had as one of its member organisations the national netball association.

See also
Bahamas at the Olympics
Bahamas at the Commonwealth Games

References

Bibliography

External links 
 
Bahamas Olympic Association

Bahamas
Bahamas
Bahamas at the Olympics
Sports governing bodies in the Bahamas
1952 establishments in the Bahamas
Sports organizations established in 1952